Will I Ever may refer to:
 "Will I Ever" (Alice Deejay song), a 2000 song from the album Who Needs Guitars Anyway?
 "Will I Ever" (Lyfe Jennings song), a track from the album Lyfe Change]]